A screenshot (also known as screen capture or screen grab) is a digital image that shows the contents of a computer display. A screenshot is created by the operating system or software running on the device powering the display. 

Additionally, screenshots can be captured by an external camera, using photography to capture contents on the screen.

Screenshot techniques

Digital techniques
The first screenshots were created with the first interactive computers around 1960. Through the 1980s, computer operating systems did not universally have built-in functionality for capturing screenshots. Sometimes text-only screens could be dumped to a text file, but the result would only capture the content of the screen, not the appearance, nor were graphics screens preservable this way. Some systems had a BSAVE command that could be used to capture the area of memory where screen data was stored, but this required access to a BASIC prompt. Systems with composite video output could be connected to a VCR, and entire screencasts preserved this way.

Most screenshots are raster images, but some vector-based GUI environments like Cairo are capable of generating vector screenshots.

Photographic techniques
Screenshot kits were available for standard (film) cameras that included a long antireflective hood to attach between the screen and camera lens, as well as a closeup lens for the camera. Polaroid film was popular for capturing screenshots, because of the instant results and close-focusing capability of Polaroid cameras. In 1988, Polaroid introduced Spectra film with a 9.2 × 7.3 image size more suited to the 4:3 aspect ratio of CRT screens.

Built-in screenshot functionality

Android
Screenshot support was added to Android in version 4.0. In older versions, some devices supported screenshot functionality with one of the following combinations:
 Press and hold the 
 Press and hold 

Screenshots can be taken by pressing , and are saved in the "Screenshot" folder in the gallery after a short sound and visual effect.

On certain devices that use modified Android; the button combination and the storage location can vary.

Also, when a keyboard is connected via USB-OTG, pressing the print screen button will take the screenshot.

There is no direct way to take screenshots programmatically in non-system apps. However, on most devices, apps may use the system screenshot functionality without special permissions.

Amazon Kindle

On Amazon Kindle devices, one can take a screenshot by:
 Kindle Paperwhite - touch and hold on the top-left and bottom-right corners of the screen (or top-right and bottom-left corners). The screen will flash and the image will be saved in the root folder of Kindle storage.
 Kindle Keyboard (Kindle 3 and Kindle DX) – Press 
Open the Photos app to access the screenshot(s).
 Kindle Fire (no volume buttons) – One needs to connect their Kindle Fire to a computer with the Kindle SDK installed and take a screenshot through the development environment.

ChromeOS

HP WebOS

Screenshots of the HP webOS can be taken. For webOS phones, simultaneously press . For the HP Touchpad, press . In either case, screenshots will be saved to the "Screen captures" folder in the "Photos" app.

Linux

On KDE or GNOME,  key behavior is quite similar to Windows. (See § Microsoft Windows.) In addition, the following screenshooting utilities are bundled with Linux distributions:
 GIMP: A raster graphics editor that can take screenshots too
 gnome-screenshot: The default screen grabbing utility in GNOME
 ImageMagick: Has an  command-line tool that captures screenshots in a variety of formats. Type  to capture the entire screen to your home directory.
 Spectacle: The default screen grabbing utility in KDE
 scrot: Allows selecting arbitrary areas of the X screen and windows.
 xwd: The screen capture utility of the X Window System

Apple iOS 

A screenshot can be taken on iOS by simultaneously pressing the Home button and the Lock button from the Original iPhone to the iPhone 8 Plus in addition to the second- and third-generation SE or the iPad models of the iPad (1st generation and later), the iPad Mini up to the 5th generation, the iPad Air up to the 3rd generation, or the first two generations of the iPad Pro or by pressing the Volume up and Lock button since the iPhone X and newer iPhone models and iPad models since the iPad Pro (3rd generation), iPad Air (4th generation), and the iPad Mini (6th generation). The screen will flash and the picture will be stored in PNG format in the "Camera Roll" if the device has a camera, or in "Saved Photos" if the device does not. From the iOS 11 update, a little preview will pop up in the bottom left corner, which can be swiped left to save or clicked to open up an editor where the screenshot can be cropped or doodled on before being saved or shared. The screenshot feature is available with iOS 2.0 and later. The same   shortcut for Mac OS is used in iOS to take a screenshot, with  bringing the screenshot directly in iOS' editing window in iOS 11 and later. Third-party Bluetooth keyboards often have a key or function key command devoted to taking a screenshot.

Apple macOS 

This screenshot is saved to the user's desktop, with one PNG file per attached monitor. If the user holds down  while doing either then the screenshot will be copied to the clipboard instead.

Beginning with Mac OS X Panther, it is possible to make a screenshot of an active application window. The current window under the cursor is highlighted, and a click on the mouse or trackpad will capture a screenshot of the entire highlighted element (including the parts offscreen or covered by other windows).

A provided application called Grab will capture a chosen area, a whole window, the whole screen, or the whole screen after 10 seconds and pops the screenshot up in a window ready for copying to the clipboard or saving as a TIFF. The Preview application, also provided, has the same capture options as Grab but opens the captured image immediately in a new window.

Since macOS 10.14 Mojave, Apple brought to users a revamped screenshot utility, called Screenshot app. A utility toolbar will show up when users press . This toolbar allows users to choose capture modes and options to take screenshots. Users can change the default location of saved screenshots from the Options menu in Screenshot app. Besides, this application supports recording Mac screen in full-sized or chosen portion.

A shell utility called "screencapture" (located in /usr/sbin/screencapture) can be used from the Terminal application or in shell scripts to capture screenshots and save them to files. Various options are available to choose the file format of the screenshot, how the screenshot is captured, if sounds are played, etc. This utility might only be available when the macOS developer tools are installed. A user cannot capture the screen while DVD Player is running.

Maemo 5 
On Maemo 5 a screenshot can be taken by pressing  simultaneously. Screenshots will be saved as "Screenshot-YYYYMMDD-HHMMSS.png" in "Images/Screenshots" on the internal storage.

Windows

On Windows, pressing  captures a screenshot of the entire desktop, while  captures only the active window. Captured screenshots do not include the mouse pointer. Windows places these captured screenshots in the clipboard, meaning that an additional program needs to retrieve them from the clipboard. Starting with Windows 8, however,  or  instantly saves a screenshot to the "Screenshots" folder in "Pictures" library. All screenshots are saved as PNG files.  Note: On some notebooks, one have to hold  and then press  instead.

Windows Vista and later include a utility called Snipping Tool, first introduced in Windows XP Tablet PC Edition. It is a screen-capture tool that allows taking screenshots ("snips") of a window, rectangular area, or free-form area. Starting with Windows 10, Snipping Tool gained time delay functionality, useful for capturing context menus. Snips can then be annotated, saved as an image file or as an HTML page, or emailed. However, it does not work with non-tablet XP versions but represents an XP compatible equivalent. Windows 7 and later also include Problem Step Recorder as part of their troubleshooting platforms that once started, automatically captures a screenshot at mouse clicks.

There are exceptions to what can be captured by this method. For example, contents in hardware overlay are not captured. This includes video images that Windows Media Player 10 or earlier play. As such, special software may be required to capture the screens of video games.

Windows Phone

In Windows Phone 8, screenshots can be taken by simultaneously pressing and holding the phone's Power button and the Start button. The screenshots are saved in the phone's native screen resolution under "screenshots" in the Photos hub. The screenshot functionality is only available for Windows Phone 8 or later.

The screenshot combination for Windows Phone 8.1 and later is the phone's Power button and the Volume Up button.

Xbox One/Series S|X

As of March 2015, an Xbox One or Xbox Series console can take a screenshot by double-pressing the Nexus button. Pressing the Y button will then save it. The equivalent voice command for this action is "Xbox, take a screenshot".

PlayStation

A PlayStation 4 or 5 console can take a screenshot by pressing and holding the SHARE button on a DualShock or DualSense controller.

External tools

Notable external tools include:

 Bandicam
 Camtasia
 CamStudio
 CloudApp
 Greenshot
 Gyazo
 IrfanView
 Jing
 KSnapshot
 Lightscreen
 Microsoft Snipping Tool
 Monosnap
 PrintKey 2000
 scrot
 ShareX
 Shotty
 Snagit
 Snapz Pro X
 VVCap
 Window Clippings
 Xfire
 XnView
 Xwd
 PicPick
Some web browsers, for example Firefox and Microsoft Edge, have a screenshot tool which can be used to capture a whole web page or part of it.

Common technical issues

Hardware overlays

On Windows systems, screenshots of games and media players sometimes fail, resulting in a blank rectangle. The reason for this is that the graphics are bypassing the normal screen and going to a high-speed graphics processor on the graphics card by using a method called hardware overlay. Generally, there is no way to extract a computed image back out of the graphics card, though software may exist for special cases or specific video cards.

One way these images can be captured is to turn off the hardware overlay. Because many computers have no hardware overlay, most programs are built to work without it, just a little slower. In Windows XP, this is disabled by opening the Display Properties menu, clicking on the "Settings" tab, clicking, "Advanced", "Troubleshoot", and moving the Hardware Acceleration Slider to "None."

Free software media players may also use the overlay but often have a setting to avoid it or have dedicated screenshot functions.

Screen recording

The screen recording capability of some screen capture programs is a time-saving way to create instructions and presentations, but the resulting files are often large.

A common problem with video recordings is the action jumps, instead of flowing smoothly, due to low frame rate. Though getting faster all the time, ordinary PCs are not yet fast enough to play videos and simultaneously capture them at professional frame rates, i.e. 30 frame/s. For many cases, high frame rates are needed for a pleasant experience.

Copyright issues

Some companies believe the use of screenshots is an infringement of copyright on their program, as it is a derivative work of the widgets and other art created for the software. Regardless of copyright, screenshots may still be legally used under the principle of fair use in the U.S. or fair dealing and similar laws in other countries.

See also

 Comparison of screencasting software
 Codeless test automation
 Print screen
 Screencast
 Thumbshot
 Video capture

References

External links
 Use Snipping Tool to capture screenshots at Microsoft

Graphical user interfaces